Tang-e Anari (also Romanized as Tang-e Ānārī) is a village in Khvajehei Rural District, Meymand District, Firuzabad County, Fars Province, Iran. At the 2006 census, its population was 19, in 5 families.

References 

Populated places in Firuzabad County